Musselroe Wind Farm is a wind farm at Cape Portland, Tasmania, Australia. It was the third wind farm built in the state, following the Bluff Point and Studland Bay Wind Farms (making up the larger Woolnorth Wind Farm).

While it is operated by Hydro Tasmania, which has a 25% stake in the farm, China-based Shenhua Clean Energy (SCE) owns a 75% stake in the farm. Guohua Energy Investment owns a 75% share in SCE, while its sister company, Shenhua Hong Kong, owning the remaining 25% share in SCE.

The farm consists of 56 Vestas V90-3MW wind turbines, with a generating capacity of 168 MW. The energy output from the Musselroe Wind Farm will be sufficient to supply electricity to around 50,000 households and abate 450,000 tonnes of  emissions annually.

The first 37 turbines were connected to the grid in 2013, and the full farm was completed in January 2014.

Operations 
The generation table uses eljmkt nemlog to obtain generation values for each month. Grid connection started in March 2013, and was fully commissioned during September 2013.

Note: Asterisk indicates power output was limited during the month.

Note: From 2018, the wind farm participated in the FCAS market; this generally reduces the amount of power provided to the grid in order to allow a ramp up when required. The wind farm now has an apparent limit of ≈153 MW, rarely returning to its previous maximum output of around ≈166 MW when the grid demands it.

See also

List of wind farms in Tasmania
List of wind farms in Australia

References

External links 
Hydro Tasmania - Musselroe Wind Farm

Wind farms in Tasmania